The Loreburn Report, or the Report of the Company Law Amendment Committee (1906) Cd 3052 was a report to the UK Parliament on the reform of company law. It discussed various issues of corporate financial reform. Three members of the committee dissented on the question of retaining the floating charge in UK insolvency law, and recommended it be abolished by statute.

Content
One of the key issues of debate concerned the use of the floating charge. The majority recommended minor reforms to ensure that floating charges created without new money being given could be avoided. A minority dissented, and recommended abolition. The majority said the following.
 

A Minority dissented on this point.

Notes

United Kingdom company law
Insolvency law of the United Kingdom